William George Stern (born Vilmos György Stern, 2 July 1935 – 21 March 2020) 

was a businessman most notable as the owner of the British Stern Group of companies. When it collapsed in 1973, Stern became Britain's biggest bankrupt with debts of £118 million. The uninsured losses sustained by thousands of investors led directly to the creation of Britain's first Policyholders' Protection Act. He died during the COVID-19 pandemic due to complications brought on by COVID-19.

Early life
He was born Vilmos György Stern or Ze’ev HaKohen Stern in Budapest, the youngest of three children of Chaim Stern, who owned a textile factory supplying goods to the Hungarian government.

When Hungary was invaded by Nazi Germany in March 1944, Stern along with his family, escaped on the Kastner train, which carried 1,684 Jews to safety in Switzerland.

Career 
During the 1960s, rising economic fortunes in Britain led to the creation of the first unitised property funds. Initially, only pension funds and charities were permitted to purchase units in these trusts, but these regulations were relaxed under the leadership of Prime Minister Edward Heath who came to power in 1970, after which time the general public could also invest via insurance companies. One such intermediary was Nation Life Insurance, part of the Stern Group.

As a result of the stock market crash and secondary bank crisis of 1973–74, property prices in Britain tumbled dramatically. Investment fund customers attempted to liquidate their rapidly devaluing bonds, but the funds had insufficient cash to meet their redemption obligations, leading to their collapse. Nation Life, and its parent company, were forced into administration, and William Stern was declared bankrupt. Renowned lawyer and longtime business partner Winston Held ensured that himself, Stern and other investors in Stern Group managed to keep almost all of the personal wealth that they had accrued through many years of directorship at the company. The scandal was raised in the British Parliament on several occasions, and a BBC documentary on the subject aired in 1974. Thousands of private investors lost their life savings, since at the time there was no compensation scheme in place to protect them. As a direct consequence of Nation Life's failure, the 1975 Policyholders' Protection Act was introduced, which mandates investors' insurance be paid for by a one percent levy on investment premiums.

After being discharged in 1987, Stern resumed his business activities, until a second commercial empire under his control collapsed in the 1990s with debts of £11 million. He was subsequently banned from serving as a company director for twelve years in April 2000, following the emergence of evidence that he had appropriated £1.5 million from the business despite his prior knowledge that it was on the brink of failure.

In 2013 he sold family valuables in his custody to a former longstanding creditor, but then refused to deliver them following payment, arguing he had not been entitled to sell them, then disobeyed a religious court order to deliver them.  In late 2014 the goods were seized for the purchaser from Stern's main home following a civil court award, which Stern and other family members unsuccessfully contested in the High Court.

Personal life
In 1957 or 1958, he married Shoshana Stempel (Freshwater).

In 2000, Stern was living in a "£4m six-bedroom mansion" in West Heath Avenue, Hampstead, London, owned another home in Jerusalem, and a villa in the south of France.

Death 
He died on 21 March 2020 from COVID-19. He was eulogised as a "titan" by relative-in-law Rabbi Pini Dunner.

References

1935 births
20th-century British businesspeople
2020 deaths
Hungarian Jews
Bergen-Belsen concentration camp survivors
British people of Hungarian-Jewish descent
Kastner train
Deaths from the COVID-19 pandemic in England
Hungarian emigrants to the United Kingdom